Yakonur (Ekinur) is a rural locality (a selo) in Ust-Kansky District, the Altai Republic, Russia. The population was 1699 as of 2016. There are 10 streets.

Geography 
Yakonur is located 17 km northeast of Ust-Kan (the district's administrative centre) by road. Ust-Kan is the nearest rural locality.

References 

Rural localities in Ust-Kansky District